Ifelodun  is a local government area in Kwara State, Nigeria. Its headquarters is in the town of Share.

The people of Ifelodun are Yorubas and mostly of Igbomina origin with roots in Ife, Oyo and Ketu. Much of the Ifelodun domain was overtaken by the Afonja/Alimi era and annexed to the present Ilorin enclave.

It has an area of 3,435 km and a population of 206,042 at the 2006 census.

The postal code of the area is 241. It includes at least 80 villages and towns.

Religion

There are three main religious groups, 
 Christianity
 Islam 
 Others (Ifa, Sango, Elegun/Masqurade, Opele, etc.)

References

Local Government Areas in Kwara State